Arbutus arizonica, commonly known as Arizona madrone, is a tree species in the heath family that is native to the southwestern United States and northwestern Mexico. Its range extends along the Sierra Madre Occidental cordillera from the Madrean Sky Islands of southeastern Arizona and southwestern New Mexico south as far as Jalisco. It has been found in Sonora, Chihuahua, Durango, and Sinaloa, with one isolated population in Tamaulipas.

The fruit is an orange-red berry. The fruits are edible by humans and used by some indigenous peoples.

References

External links

Lady Bird Johnson Wildflower Center, University of Texas
photo of herbarium specimen at Missouri Botanical Garden, collected in Arizona in 1881

arizonica
Flora of Arizona
Flora of New Mexico
Flora of Northwestern Mexico
Flora of the Sonoran Deserts
Trees of Mexico
Trees of the Southwestern United States
~
Flora of the Sierra Madre Occidental
Plants described in 1886
Least concern flora of North America
Least concern flora of the United States